Back Roads is an Australian factual television show that looks at Australian regional towns. This observational documentary series began on the ABC on 30 November 2015. It follows political journalist Heather Ewart as she visits remote towns and regions to visit local communities.

 the executive producer was Brigid Donovan and the supervising producer  Kerri Ritchie. The field producers were Karen Michelmore and Louise Turley. A second series began screening in 2016.
The theme song is sung by Australian singer-songwriter, Rebecca Barnard.

Episodes

Series 1
 Series 1 Ep 1 "Ceduna" (First broadcast 30 Nov 2015)
Ceduna is a Nullarbor frontier town on the Great Australian Bight, where breaking conventions is the rule.  
 Series 1 Ep 2 "Winton" (First broadcast 07 Dec 2015)
Winton is a western Queensland town in "Waltzing Matilda" country, where you can spend a day at the races, go digging for dinosaur bones and meet a former Governor-General of Australia, Dame Quentin Bryce.
 Series 1 Ep 3 "Yackandandah" (First broadcast 14 Dec 2015)
Yackandandah, in the foothills of Victoria's high country, is a picture-perfect gold rush town which gambled on itself and won. 
 Series 1 Ep 4 "Karumba "(First broadcast 21 Dec 2015)
Karumba is a remote fishing town in Far North Queensland, where locals love the isolation.
 Series 1 Ep 5 "Birchip" (First broadcast 28 Dec 2015)
Birchip, in the Victorian Mallee, is a town in the heart of wheat country which thrives on bucking trends.
 Series 1 Ep 6 "Derby" (First broadcast 04 Jan 2016)
Derby, in the Kimberley region of Western Australia, is rich in cultural diversity.
 Series 1 Ep 7 "Queenstown" (First broadcast 11 Jan 2016)
Meet the Young Tasmanian of the year, Adam Mostogl, and explore the stories from the community of Queenstown, in the West Coast region of Tasmania. 
 Series 1 Ep 8 "Clarence River" (First broadcast 18 Jan 2016)
The Clarence River is in the Northern Rivers district of New South Wales.

Series 2
 Series 2 Ep 1 "Mundulla"
Mundulla is a tiny South Australian community which cherishes its old world values, but doesn't mind a bit of healthy competition.  
 Series 2 Ep 2 "Normanton"
A hairdresser and her 76 year old apprentice take a ten day road-trip from Innisfail to Normanton in Queensland's Gulf country.
 Series 2 Ep 3 "Mallacoota"
Mallacoota is a remote place at the end of the road on the far eastern tip of Victoria. It is known for its natural beauty and wilderness, its isolation has bred a determination in the town to look after its own.
 Series 2 Ep 4 "Thursday Island"
Thursday Island is a laid-back paradise but its isolation can present problems. Locals are rising to the challenge and are carving out a new future
 Series 2 Ep 5 "Katanning"
The sheep and wheat town of Katanning lays out the welcome mat and shows how it has transformed itself, holding some delightful surprises.
 Series 2 Ep 6 "Hermannsburg"
Hermannsburg (known as Ntaria in Western Arrarnta language), the birthplace of Albert Namatjira, is nurturing both culture and creativity in its young people.
 Series 2 Ep 7 "White Cliffs"
White Cliffs is a tiny outback town known for opal mining and underground dugouts but the community is also full of colourful surprises.
 Series 2 Ep 8 "Cygnet 
Cygnet is the seaside hamlet of southern Tasmania's Huon Valley, undergoing some big changes with runaways from the city flooding in to town.
 Series 2 Ep 9 "Harrow"
Harrow is a creative community that took to heart the mantra "reinvent or perish" and found unique ways to bring new people and fresh ideas into the town.

Series 3
 Series 3 Ep 1 "Corryong"
A bucket-load of beauty and a fascinating history haven't been enough to cement Corryong's success but that's changing, with some young people starting to move back.
 Series 3 Ep 2 "Dunalley"
Dunalley was almost wiped out by bushfires in 2013 but instead of destroying them, the tragedy has proven to be a catalyst for many people to pursue a new path.
 Series 3 Ep 3 "Oodnadatta" (Part 1)
Heading along the legendary Oodnadatta Track, the journey begins in the small town of Marree, where the Oodnadatta and Birdsville Tracks meet.
 Series 3 Ep 4 "Oodnadatta" (Part 2)
Continuing along the Oodnadatta Track and hitching a lift with the truck-driver who delivers essential supplies and meeting the Pink Roadhouse owner, as well as the workers at an isolated cattle station.
 Series 3 Ep 5 "Robe"
Robe is a fishing port on South Australia's Limestone coast that is known for helping others through their community run project 'Robe to Recovery' which helps War Veterans take time off from their everyday life.
 Series 3 Ep 6 "Canowindra" 
Known as the hot-air ballooning capital of Australia, the Canowindra community is looking to reinvent its future.
 Series 3 Ep 7 "Pine Creek"
Pine Creek is a pioneering outback town in the Northern Territory on the fringes of Kakadu National Park which has long been a boom or bust mining area.
 Series 3 Ep 8 "Pilbara"
The remarkable locals of the Pilbara region of Western Australia are driving change as the mining boom ends.

Series 4
The Series 4 episodes are:

Series 4 Ep 1 "Waterfall Way" (New South Wales)
Series 4 Ep 2 "Murray River, South Australia"
Series 4 Ep 3 "Natimuk" (Victoria)
Series 4 Ep 4 "Scottsdale" (Tasmania)
Series 4 Ep 5 "Thallon" (Queensland)
Series 4 Ep 6 "Robinvale" (Victoria)
Series 4 Ep 7 "Tiwi Islands" (Northern Territory)
Series 4 Ep 8 "Nyngan" (New South Wales)
Series 4 Ep 9 "The Greengrocer" (Queensland)
Series 4 Ep 10 "Lightning Ridge" (New South Wales)
Series 4 Ep 11 "Furneaux Islands" (Tasmania)
Series 4 Ep 12 "Beaufort" (Victoria)
Series 4 Ep 13 "Marble Bar" (Western Australia)
Series 4 Ep 14 "The Coorong" (South Australia)
Series 4 Ep 15 "Finke" (Northern Territory)
Series 4 Ep 16 "Windorah" (Queensland)

Series 5
The Series 5 episodes are:

 Series 5 Ep 1: "Glen Helen Ride" in Alice Springs (Northern Territory)
 Series 5 Ep 2: "Tolmie" (Victoria)
 Series 5 Ep 3: "Woolgoolga" (New South Wales)
 Series 5 Ep 4: "Burketown" (Queensland)
 Series 5 Ep 5: "Kulin" (Western Australia)
 Series 5 Ep 6: "Fish Creek" (Victoria)
 Series 5 Ep 7: "Flinders Ranges" (South Australia)
 Series 5 Ep 8: "Riverina" (New South Wales)
 Series 5 Ep 9: "Snow journey" in the Australian Alps (Victoria and New South Wales)
 Series 5 Ep 10: "Bullo Shire" (Queensland)
 Series 5 Ep 11: "Wynyard "(Tasmania)
 Series 5 Ep 12: "Clunes" (Victoria)
 Series 5 Ep 13: "Koroit" (Victoria)
 Series 5 Ep 14: "Menindee" (New South Wales)
 Series 5 Ep 15: "Show Town" (Queensland), about life in a travelling show
 Series 5 Ep 16: "Jabiru" (Northern Territory)

Series 6
The Series 6 episodes are:

 Series 6 Ep 1: "Nullarbor, Part 1:The Endless Horizon" (South Australia)
 Series 6 Ep 2: "Nullarbor, Part 2: Turning Back Time" (Western Australia)
 Series 6 Ep 3: "Rokewood-Corindhap" (Victoria)
 Series 6 Ep 4: "Biloela" (Queensland) and the town's campaign on behalf of asylum seekers Priya and Nades
 Series 6 Ep 5: "Penguin" (Tasmania)
 Series 6 Ep 6: "Girgarre" (Victoria)
 Series 6 Ep 7: "Dampier Peninsula" (Western Australia)
 Series 6 Ep 8: "Omeo" (Victoria)

Series 7
The Series 7 episodes are:

Series 7 Ep 1: "Cobar"
Series 7 Ep 2: "Kyogle"
Series 7 Ep 3: "Cooper Pedy"
Series 7 Ep 4: "Conquering Isolation Special"
Series 7 Ep 5: "Eugowra"
Series 7 Ep 6: "Agnes Water & Seventeen Seventy"
Series 7 Ep 7: "Local Heroes Special"
Series 7 Ep 8: "Mallacoota"
Series 7 Ep 9: "Cooktown"
Series 7 Ep 10: "Tenterfield"
Series 7 Ep 11: "Adelaide River"
Series 7 Ep 12: "Central Highlands, Tasmania"
Series 7 Ep 13: "The Mallee"
Series 7 Ep 14: "Cloncurry"
Series 7 Ep 15: "Rupanyup & Minyip"
Series 7 Ep 16: "Strahan"

Series 8
The Series 8 episodes are:

Series 8 Ep 1: "The Great Australian Road Trip"
Series 8 Ep 2: "Tom Price"
Series 8 Ep 3: "Cradle Mountain"
Series 8 Ep 4: "Boulia"
Series 8 Ep 5: "Eyre Peninsula"
Series 8 Ep 6: "Port Campbell"
Series 8 Ep 7: "Charleville"
Series 8 Ep 8: "Longford"

References

External links
Official website 

Australian Broadcasting Corporation original programming
Australian factual television series
English-language television shows
2015 Australian television series debuts